Jorge Isaac Veytia is a Mexican actor, writer and lawyer, mainly a private-contract notary. He is a polyglot, combining his work and studies as a specialist in Ancient Egyptian Law, Classic literature, Biblical Studies and International Commercial Contracts.

Life as an actor 
During his early life appeared in Mexican theatrical and multimedia productions.

Life as a lawyer 
During 2004 he started working for UNIDROIT (The International Institute for the Unification of Private Law) preparing the Guide to International Master Franchise Arrangements in its Spanish version. Nowadays, this Guide is a reference for all local legislations in Latin America concerning the development of the franchise industry.

He is a graduate from the Panamerican University in Mexico City since 2005, and since then, he has practiced mainly as a private contract notary. After several years studying Ancient Egyptian culture, he then published openly his first book concerning Ancient Egyptian Law.

The next year, after travelling and studying all across the globe, he worked for the prestigious Italian firm Lexjus, nearby Venice, where he focused in the area of international contracts in South America.

He speaks Spanish, Portuguese, German, French, Italian, Polish and English and is admitted into practice in several countries. Today, he combines his work in Berlin, Germany, focused on international contracts and sharing time with his family in Poznan, Poland.

In 2012 he published a collection of poems, tales and essays named "Obertura". Some years later, an anthology of English and Russian folk tales named "Way to Fulfilment".

Narcolepsy 
In 2002 he was diagnosed with narcolepsy. Jorge Veytia's experiences and treatments have been used several times in the Mexican press and multimedia in order to show how narcolepsy is treated and how patients can recover without major problems. He has been totally recovered.

References 

Mexican male actors
21st-century Mexican lawyers
Poznan
Poznan
Living people
1981 births
People from Poznań